
Gmina Boronów is a rural gmina (administrative district) in Lubliniec County, Silesian Voivodeship, in southern Poland. It was formed in 1993, having previously been part of Gmina Herby.

The gmina contains part of the protected area called Upper Liswarta Forests Landscape Park.

Villages
Gmina Boronów contains the villages and settlements of Boronów, Cielec, Dębowa Góra, Doły, Grojec, Hucisko, Sitki, Szklana Huta and Zumpy.

Neighbouring gminas
Gmina Boronów is bordered by the gminas of Herby, Konopiska and Koszęcin.

Twin towns – sister cities

Gmina Boronów is twinned with:
 Komorní Lhotka, Czech Republic

References

Boronow
Lubliniec County